Slatina is a city borough of Brno, the second largest city in the Czech Republic. It is located in the eastern part of the city and is somewhat separated from other parts. Slatina became a part of Brno in 1919 and as of 2011, it had 9,360 inhabitants.

Slatina has a well-preserved centre. The south of the district contains mostly modern houses, while the north of the district contains many panel houses built in the 1980s.

Transport
Slatina is served by two trolleybus lines and several bus lines, which connect the area to the city centre. The main Czech motorway, the D1, passes close by.

Economy
Slatina neighbours Černovická terasa, a commercial and industrial zone which houses offices of several international companies including Honeywell and Daikin.

External links

Neighbourhoods in the Czech Republic
Brno